O Predileto is a 1975 Brazilian film directed by Roberto Palmari, based on the novel Totônio Pacheco written by João Alphonsus.

Cast 
Joffre Soares .... Totônio Pacheco
Susana Gonçalves .... Coló
Othon Bastos ...Dr. Fernando
Célia Helena
Fernando Peixoto
Wanda Kosmo
João Carlos Ferreira
Xandó Batista
Ruthinéa de Moraes
Abrahão Farc
Maria Célia Camargo

Awards and nominations
 Gramado Film Festival (1976)
Winner in the categories
Best Picture 
Best Actor (Joffre Soares)
Best Cinematography (Roberto Palmari)
Best Screenplay (Roberto Palmari and Roberto Santos)

APCA Award
Winner in the categories
Best Picture 
Best Supporting Actor (Xandó Batista)
Best Scenic Design (Hermínio Queiroz Telles)

References

External links 
O Predileto on IMDb

Brazilian drama films
1975 films
1970s Portuguese-language films
Best Picture APCA Award winners
1975 drama films